The Kapllan Pasha Tomb is a Muslim Türbe of Albania, located in the center of Tirana.
It is a Cultural Monument of the first category and was so declared by the government of Albania in 1948. It was built in the early 19th century, with carved stones and has an octagonal shape. The columns are made of stone, and placed also on stone bases and capitals with plant decor on the surface. The former ruler of Tirana was interned here in the 19th century, but was later repatriated back to Istanbul, Turkey.

It stood next to the Sylejman Pasha Mosque, which was destroyed during World War II and is not to be confused with the Suleyman Pasha Tomb. It has recently been restored by the Municipality of Tirana.

See also 

Tirana
TID Tower
Landmarks in Tirana
Tourism in Albania

References 

Cultural Monuments of Albania
Buildings and structures in Tirana
Ottoman mausoleums
Tourist attractions in Tirana